JBV is a commonly used abbreviation for the following subjects:

Management
 Journal of Business Venturing, a bimonthly peer-reviewed academic journal on entrepreneurship, published by Elsevier

People
 Jacqueline B. Vaughn, a twentieth century American Chicago Public Schools special education teacher and labor leader
 Jean-Baptiste Vuillaume, a nineteenth century French luthier, businessman and inventor

Travel
 Jernbaneverket, a government agency responsible for owning, maintaining, operating and developing the Norwegian railway network